Manor may refer to:

Land ownership
Manorialism or "manor system", the method of land ownership (or "tenure") in parts of medieval Europe, notably England
Lord of the manor, the owner of an agreed area of land (or "manor") under manorialism
Manor house, the main residence of the lord of the manor 
Estate (land), the land (and buildings) that belong to large house, synonymous with the modern understanding of a manor.  
Manor (in Colonial America), a form of tenure restricted to certain Proprietary colonies
Manor (in 17th-century Canada), the land tenure unit under the Seigneurial system of New France

Places
 Manor railway station, a former railway station in Victoria, Australia
 Manor, Saskatchewan, Canada
 Manor, India, a census town in Palghar District, Maharashtra
 The Manor, a luxury neighborhood in Western Hanoi, Vietnam

United Kingdom
 Manor (Sefton ward), a municipal borough of Sefton ward, Merseyside, England
 Manor, Scottish Borders, a parish in Peeblesshire, Scotland
 Manor, South Yorkshire, an electoral ward of Sheffield, England
 Manors railway station, a railway station in Newcastle-upon-Tyne

United States
Manor, California, an unincorporated community in the state of California
Manor, Georgia, an unincorporated community in Ware County in the state of Georgia (it is pronounced with long "a")
Manor, Ohio, a largely uninhabited area in the state of Ohio
Manor, Pennsylvania, a borough
Manor St. George, a tract of land on Long Island, New York
Manor, Texas, a city and suburb of Austin
Manor Township, Armstrong County, Pennsylvania, a township in the state of Pennsylvania
Manor Township, Lancaster County, Pennsylvania, a township in the state of Pennsylvania
Manorville, New York, a hamlet within Manor St. George

People with the name
Ehud Manor (1941–2005), Israeli songwriter, translator, and radio and TV personality
Leroy J. Manor (1921–2021), United States Air Force Lieutenant General and pilot
Manor Solomon (born 1999), Israeli international association footballer

Other uses
Manor (department store), in Switzerland
Manor Class or GWR 7800 Class, a class of Great Western Railway engines
Manor Farm, the setting for the story Animal Farm by George Orwell
Manor Motorsport, a British motor racing team
Manor Racing, a British Formula One team
Manor Records, a record label

See also

 
The Manor (disambiguation)
Manor House (disambiguation)
Manor High School (disambiguation)
Manors railway station, Newcastle upon Tyne, England
Manors Metro station, Newcastle upon Tyne, England
Manner (disambiguation)
Manners (disambiguation)